John Charles Harding, 2nd Baron Harding of Petherton (12 February 1928 – 6 June 2016), was a British Army officer and hereditary peer.

Harding was educated at Marlborough College and Worcester College, Oxford (MA). He was commissioned into the British Army and served with the 11th Hussars, reaching the rank of major. He succeeded his father John Harding, 1st Baron Harding of Petherton to the title of Baron Harding of Petherton in 1989.

By his wife, Harriet Hare (daughter of Major General Francis Hare), whom he married in 1966, he had two sons and one daughter. She died on 4 December 2012. Their daughter, Dido Harding, Baroness Harding of Winscombe, is married to Conservative MP John Penrose. Harding died in June 2016 at the age of 88.

Arms

References

Harding of Petherton. Burke's Peerage

External links

1928 births
2016 deaths
People educated at Marlborough College
Alumni of Worcester College, Oxford
Barons in the Peerage of the United Kingdom
11th Hussars officers
John Harding family

Harding of Petherton